Kirejewszczyzna  is a village in the administrative district of Gmina Dąbrowa Białostocka, within Sokółka County, Podlaskie Voivodeship, in north-eastern Poland.

References

Kirejewszczyzna